Hezekiah Rogers (1753 – September 4, 1811) was a member of the Connecticut House of Representatives from Norwalk in the sessions of May 1786, and October 1787. He was a delegate to the convention in Connecticut to ratify the United States Constitution in 1788. He later served as chief clerk in the War Office in Washington, D. C.

Early life and family 
Rogers was the son of Dr. Uriah Rogers Sr. and Hannah Lockwood.

Political life 
Rogers was a member of the Connecticut House of Representatives from Norwalk in the sessions of May 1786, and October 1787.

On November 12, 1787, the inhabitants of the town of Norwalk had a town meeting with Colonel Colonel Thomas Fitch as moderator. Rogers and Samuel Silliman were chosen as delegates to meet in a convention at Hartford, the following January to ratify the United States Constitution. Connecticut ratified the Constitution on January 8, 1788 making it the fifth state to do so.

Jesse Lee 

In June 1789, Jesse Lee, a founder of the Methodist Church, came to Norwalk to preach his first sermon in Connecticut. He had some reason to believe that the Rogers house on Cross Street would be available for the meeting, and word had been sent around among those interested to assemble there. When Lee arrived, Hezekiah was not at home, and his wife hesitated to open  the house to a public meeting. A neighbor refused to let Lee use her orchard for concern that the gathering would trample down the grass. Finally, Lee assembled his audience under an apple tree by the roadside and preached his sermon from the text "Ye must be born again." Such was the beginning of Methodism in Norwalk. Today, there is a stone marker at the location.

References 

1753 births
1811 deaths
Members of the Connecticut House of Representatives
Politicians from Norwalk, Connecticut
People of colonial Connecticut